Menarola is a comune (municipality) in the Province of Sondrio in the Italian region Lombardy, located about  north of Milan and about  northwest of Sondrio, on the border with Switzerland.

Menarola borders the following municipalities: Gordona, Lostallo (Switzerland), Mese, San Giacomo Filippo, Soazza (Switzerland).

Demographic evolution

References

Cities and towns in Lombardy